Woodmere Art Museum, located in the Chestnut Hill section of Philadelphia, Pennsylvania, has a collection of paintings, prints, sculpture and photographs focusing on artists from the Delaware Valley and includes works by Thomas Pollock Anshutz, Severo Antonelli, Jasper Francis Cropsey (The Spirit of Peace), Joan Wadleigh Curran, Daniel Garber, Edward Moran, Violet Oakley, Herbert Pullinger, Edward Willis Redfield, Nelson Shanks, Jessie Willcox Smith, Benjamin West (The Fatal Wounding of Sir Philip Sidney), Philip Jamison, Barbara Bullock and N. C. Wyeth (Anthony and Mr. Bonnyfeather).

The collection includes the Violet Oakley lunette paintings of The Child and Tradition, Youth and the Arts, and Man and Science.

Classes
Woodmere provides art classes for adults and children and conducts a variety of special events and exhibitions including gallery talks, field trips, lectures, concerts and an annual juried exhibition.

History
The museum was opened in 1940, founded by Charles Knox Smith (1845–1916), an oil and mining businessman, in his will. Smith was born in the Kensington neighborhood of Philadelphia and began his career as a grocer's boy and as an oil wagon driver.  He rose to become a partner in that oil firm and subsequently invested in his own oil brokerage and a gold and silver mining company in Mexico.

Smith's collection of paintings, sculpture and antiques form the base of the permanent collection.  It is housed in his Victorian mansion, Woodmere, to which Smith had added large exhibition spaces.

Collection highlights

References

External links

 Exhibitions at Woodmere

Art museums and galleries in Philadelphia
Institutions accredited by the American Alliance of Museums
Art museums established in 1940
1940 establishments in Pennsylvania
Chestnut Hill, Philadelphia